The following is a list of state highways in Kentucky with numbers from 3000 to 5999.

3000-3099
 KY 3000 (removed 1988)
 KY 3001- from US 421 near Cranks to US 421 in Chevrolet
 KY 3002- from US 127 near Napoleon to KY 16 in Napoleon
 KY 3003- from US 62 in Oddvilleto near Venus
 KY 3004- from KY 1744 in Kelat to KY 1053 near Antioch
 KY 3005- from Western Kentucky Parkway near Elizabethtown to US 62 / KY 61 in Elizabethtown (established 1987)
 KY 3006
 KY 3007
 KY 3008
 KY 3009
 KY 3010
 KY 3011 (removed 2014)
 KY 3012
 KY 3013 (removed 2014)
 KY 3014
 KY 3015 (removed 2022)
 KY 3016- from KY 982 in Cynthiana to KY 36 / KY 356 in Cynthiana (established 1987)
 KY 3017
 KY 3018
 KY 3019- from KY 101 near Rhoda to KY 259 near Rhoda (established 2002)
 KY 3020
 KY 3021- from KY 259 near Rhoda to KY 259 in Brownsville (established 2002)
 KY 3022 (removed 2018)
 KY 3023 (removed 2002)
 KY 3024
 KY 3025
 KY 3026 (removed 2012)
 KY 3027 (removed 2012)
 KY 3028 (removed 2012)
 KY 3029 (removed 2012)
 KY 3030 (removed 2010)
 KY 3031 (removed 2010)
 KY 3032 (removed 2010)
 KY 3033
 KY 3034
 KY 3035
 KY 3036
 KY 3037
 KY 3038
 KY 3039
 KY 3040
 KY 3041
 KY 3042
 KY 3043
 KY 3044
 KY 3045
 KY 3046
 KY 3047
 KY 3048
 KY 3049
 KY 3050
 KY 3051
 KY 3052
 KY 3053
 KY 3054
 KY 3055
 KY 3056
 KY 3057
 KY 3058
 KY 3059
 KY 3060
 KY 3061
 KY 3062
 KY 3063
 KY 3064
 KY 3065
 KY 3066
 KY 3067
 KY 3068
 KY 3069- Spur from KY 864 in Louisville
 KY 3070
 KY 3071 (removed 2001)
 KY 3072 (removed 2018)
 KY 3073
 KY 3074
 KY 3075
 KY 3076
 KY 3077
 KY 3078
 KY 3079
 KY 3080
 KY 3081 (removed 2018)
 KY 3082 (removed by 1980)
 KY 3083
 KY 3084
 KY 3085
 KY 3086
 KY 3087
 KY 3088
 KY 3089
 KY 3090 (removed 2018)
 KY 3091
 KY 3092
 KY 3093 (removed 2014)
 KY 3094
 KY 3095- from US 127 / KY 227 in Owenton to KY 1287 near Owenton (established 1987)
 KY 3096 (established 1987)
 KY 3097
 KY 3098
 KY 3099

3100-3199
 KY 3100 (removed 2001)
 KY 3101
 KY 3102
 KY 3103
 KY 3104
 KY 3105
 KY 3106
 KY 3107 (removed 2008)
 KY 3108
 KY 3109
 KY 3110
 KY 3111- Temporary route number during construction in 2007; became part of US 119 when construction was completed in 2008
 KY 3111 (removed 1992)
 KY 3112
 KY 3113
 KY 3114
 KY 3115
 KY 3116
 KY 3117
 KY 3118
 KY 3119 (removed 2006)
 KY 3120 (removed 2006)
 KY 3121 (removed 2006)
 KY 3122 (removed 2006)
 KY 3123 (removed 2006)
 KY 3124 (removed 2022)
 KY 3125 (removed 2022)
 KY 3126
 KY 3127
 KY 3128
 KY 3129
 KY 3130
 KY 3131
 KY 3132
 KY 3133 (removed 1998)
 KY 3134 (removed 1997)
 KY 3135
 KY 3136
 KY 3137
 KY 3138
 KY 3139
 KY 3140
 KY 3141
 KY 3142
 KY 3143
 KY 3144
 KY 3145- from I-65 near Bowling Green to US 68 / KY 80 in Bowling Green (established 2017)
 KY 3145 (removed 2004)
 KY 3146
 KY 3147
 KY 3148
 KY 3149
 KY 3150
 KY 3151
 KY 3152
 KY 3153
 KY 3154
 KY 3155- from KY 259 in Leitchfield to KY 259 in Leitchfield
 KY 3156- from US 127 / KY 90 near Snow to KY 2063 near Upchurch (established 1980)
 KY 3157 (removed 2011)
 KY 3158
 KY 3159
 KY 3160- from US 68 / KY 80 in Glasgow to US 31E in Glasgow (established 2004, removed 2012)
 KY 3160 (removed 1988)
 KY 3161
 KY 3162
 KY 3163
 KY 3164
 KY 3165
 KY 3166
 KY 3167
 KY 3168 (removed 2014)
 KY 3169
 KY 3170
 KY 3171
 KY 3172- from KY 73 near South Union to KY 240 near Petros (established 1997)
 KY 3173
 KY 3174
 KY 3175
 KY 3176
 KY 3177
 KY 3178 (removed 2022)
 KY 3179
 KY 3180
 KY 3181
 KY 3182- from KY 79 near Dimple to KY 1083 at Needmore (established 1983)
 KY 3183
 KY 3184
 KY 3185
 KY 3186
 KY 3187
 KY 3188
 KY 3189
 KY 3190
 KY 3191
 KY 3192
 KY 3193
 KY 3194
 KY 3195
 KY 3196
 KY 3197
 KY 3198
 KY 3199

3200-3299
 KY 3200
 KY 3201
 KY 3202 (established 1996)
 KY 3202 (established 1984, removed 1991)
 KY 3203 (established 2001, removed 2005)
 KY 3203 (established 1984, removed 1991)
 KY 3204 (established 1985)
 KY 3205- from KY 1187 at Silver City to KY 70 near South Hill (established 1983)
 KY 3206
 KY 3207
 KY 3208 (removed 2005)
 KY 3209
 KY 3210
 KY 3211
 KY 3212
 KY 3213 (removed 2001)
 KY 3214
 KY 3215
 KY 3216
 KY 3217
 KY 3218
 KY 3219
 KY 3220
 KY 3221
 KY 3222
 KY 3223
 KY 3224
 KY 3225- from US 31W in Bowling Green to US 31W / US 68 / KY 80 in Bowling Green (established 1984)
 KY 3226
 KY 3227
 KY 3228
 KY 3229
 KY 3230- Spur from KY 248 at Taylorsville Lake State Park (established 1984)
 KY 3231 (removed 2015)
 KY 3232
 KY 3233
 KY 3234
 KY 3235 (removed 2017)
 KY 3236
 KY 3237
 KY 3238- Loop from US 45 Bus. / US 60 Bus. in Paducah (established 2001)
 KY 3238 (established 1985, removed 1992)
 KY 3239 (established 1986, removed 2011)
 KY 3240- from US 431 / KY 2146 in Russellville to US 68 Bus. in Russellville (established 2012)
 KY 3240 (established 1986, removed 1987)
 KY 3241
 KY 3242
 KY 3243
 KY 3244
 KY 3245
 KY 3246
 KY 3247
 KY 3248
 KY 3249
 KY 3250 (removed 2001)
 KY 3251
 KY 3252
 KY 3253
 KY 3254
 KY 3255
 KY 3256
 KY 3257
 KY 3258
 KY 3259
 KY 3260
 KY 3261
 KY 3262
 KY 3263
 KY 3264
 KY 3265
 KY 3266
 KY 3267
 KY 3268
 KY 3269
 KY 3270
 KY 3271
 KY 3272
 KY 3273
 KY 3274
 KY 3275
 KY 3276
 KY 3277
 KY 3278
 KY 3279 (removed 2001)
 KY 3280
 KY 3281
 KY 3282
 KY 3283
 KY 3284
 KY 3285
 KY 3286
 KY 3287
 KY 3288
 KY 3289
 KY 3290
 KY 3291
 KY 3292
 KY 3293
 KY 3294- from US 60 / KY 180 in Cannonsburg to US 23 / US 60 in Catlettsburg (removed 1987)
 KY 3295
 KY 3296
 KY 3297
 KY 3298
 KY 3299

3300-3399
KY 3300
KY 3301
KY 3302
KY 3303 (removed 2020)
KY 3304
KY 3305
 KY 3306
 KY 3307
 KY 3308
 KY 3309
 KY 3310
 KY 3311
 KY 3312
 KY 3313
 KY 3314
 KY 3315
 KY 3316
 KY 3317
 KY 3318
 KY 3319
 KY 3320
 KY 3321
 KY 3322
 KY 3323
 KY 3324
 KY 3325
 KY 3326
 KY 3327
 KY 3328
 KY 3329
 KY 3330
 KY 3331
 KY 3332
 KY 3333
 KY 3334
 KY 3335
 KY 3336
 KY 3337
 KY 3338
 KY 3339
 KY 3340
 KY 3341
 KY 3342
 KY 3343
 KY 3344
 KY 3345
 KY 3346
 KY 3347
 KY 3348
 KY 3349
 KY 3350
 KY 3351
 KY 3352
 KY 3353
 KY 3354
 KY 3355
 KY 3356
 KY 3357
 KY 3358
 KY 3359
 KY 3360
 KY 3361
 KY 3362
 KY 3363
 KY 3364
 KY 3365
 KY 3366
 KY 3367
 KY 3368
 KY 3369
 KY 3370
 KY 3371
 KY 3372 (removed 2005)
 KY 3373
 KY 3374
 KY 3375
 KY 3376
 KY 3377
 KY 3378
 KY 3379
 KY 3380
 KY 3381
 KY 3382
 KY 3383
 KY 3384
 KY 3385
 KY 3386
 KY 3387
 KY 3388
 KY 3389
 KY 3390
 KY 3391
 KY 3392
 KY 3393
 KY 3394
 KY 3395
 KY 3396
 KY 3397
 KY 3398
 KY 3399

3400-3499
 KY 3400
 KY 3401
 KY 3402
 KY 3403
 KY 3404
 KY 3405
 KY 3406
 KY 3407
 KY 3408
 KY 3409
 KY 3410
 KY 3411
 KY 3412
 KY 3413
 KY 3414
 KY 3415
 KY 3416
 KY 3417
 KY 3418
 KY 3419
 KY 3420
 KY 3421
 KY 3422
 KY 3423
 KY 3424
 KY 3425
 KY 3426
 KY 3427
 KY 3428
 KY 3429
 KY 3430
 KY 3431
 KY 3432
 KY 3433
 KY 3434
 KY 3435
 KY 3436
 KY 3437
 KY 3438
 KY 3439
 KY 3440
 KY 3441
 KY 3442
 KY 3443
 KY 3444
 KY 3445
 KY 3446
 KY 3447
 KY 3448
 KY 3449
 KY 3450
 KY 3451
 KY 3452
 KY 3453
 KY 3454
 KY 3455
 KY 3456
 KY 3457 (removed 2022)
 KY 3458
 KY 3459
 KY 3460
 KY 3461
 KY 3462
 KY 3463
 KY 3464
 KY 3465
 KY 3466
 KY 3467
 KY 3468
 KY 3469 (removed 2014)
 KY 3470
 KY 3471 (removed 2014)
 KY 3472
 KY 3473
 KY 3474 (removed 2014)
 KY 3475 (removed 2014)
 KY 3476
 KY 3477
 KY 3478
 KY 3479
 KY 3480
 KY 3481
 KY 3482
 KY 3483
 KY 3484
 KY 3485
 KY 3486
 KY 3487 (removed 2021)
 KY 3488
 KY 3489
 KY 3490
 KY 3491
 KY 3492
 KY 3493 (removed 1999) 
 KY 3494 (removed 2000)
 KY 3495
 KY 3496
 KY 3497
 KY 3498
 KY 3499- from KY 98 in Scottsville to US 31E near Scottsville (established 1989)

3500-5999
 KY 3500- from KY 1147 at Petroleum to KY 100 in Scottsville (established 1989)
 KY 3501
 KY 3502 (removed 2022)
 KY 3503
 KY 3504
 KY 3505
 KY 3506
 KY 3507
 KY 3508
 KY 3509
 KY 3510
 KY 3511
 KY 3512
 KY 3513
 KY 3514
 KY 3515
 KY 3516
 KY 3517
 KY 3518
 KY 3519- from US 68 Bus. in Russellville to US 431 near Epleys Station
 KY 3520- from US 60 near West Future City to US 60 near Paducah (established 2002)
 KY 3521- from TN 174 at the Tennessee state line to KY 482 near Adolphus (established 2005)
 KY 3522- from US 41 to near Henderson
 KY 3523- from US 127 near Monterey to KY 355 near Monterey (established 2001)
 KY 3524- US 68 in Edmonton to KY 80 in Edmonton
 KY 3525
 KY 3526
 KY 3527
 KY 3528
 KY 3529- from KY 3520 near Paducah to US 60 near Paducah (established 2003)
 KY 3531
 KY 3532 (short-lived route that existed from January 2017 to July 2017)
 KY 3533
 KY 3534
 KY 3535
 KY 3536
 KY 3538 (established 2021)
 KY 3539
 KY 3541
 KY 3543
 KY 3545- Spur from KY 70 in Morgantown (established 2011)
 KY 3545- Spur from US 150 in Stanford (established 2016)
 KY 3545- from KY 1505 / KY 3275 near Conway to KY 3105 near Conway (established 2016)
 KY 3547- from KY 52 to KY 499 (established 2018)
 KY 3548- from KY 355 near Gratz to KY 22 at Pleasant Home (established 2012)
 KY 3549- from KY 845 near Monterey to KY 22 near Owenton (established 2012)
 KY 3550
 KY 3552
KY 3558
 KY 3560
KY 3568
 KY 3571
 KY 3600- from KY 1297 near Glasgow to US 68 / KY 80 / US 68 Bus. in Glasgow (established 2015)
 KY 3606
 KY 3608
 KY 3611- from KY 743 in Chalybeate to KY 101 in Chalybeate (established 2011)
 KY 3629
 KY 3630- from KY 578 at Greenmount to US 421 / KY 30 at Tyner (established 2011)
 KY 3677
 KY 3680 (established 2019)
 KY 3716
 KY 3886 (established 2017)
 KY 3900 (established 2020)
 KY 6319- Spur from KY 1747 in Louisville (established 1991)

See also
List of primary state highways in Kentucky

External links
Kentucky Transportation Cabinet - Division of Planning

 3000
State3001